The Kenya Cricket Association Centenary Tournament (also known as the Sameer Cup) was a four team ODI cricket tournament held in Kenya during the 1996–97 season.

Squads

Points table

Group matches

1st match

2nd match

3rd match

4th match

5th match

6th match

Final

The final took place between South Africa and Pakistan at the Gymkhana Club Ground in Nairobi. Pakistan had qualified for the final by edging past Sri Lanka on net run rate, largely due to their first innings effort of 9 for 371 when the two teams met.

Saeed Anwar won the toss for Pakistan and elected to bat first. They were all out of 203 in the 46th over with Donald and Crookes taking 3 wickets each. Ijaz Ahmed top scored for Pakistan with 47. In reply the South Africans started off well, putting on 77 for the 1st wicket before Shahid Afridi took a couple of quick wickets. Gary Kirsten finished unbeaten on 118 off just 127 as his side reached their target in the 39th over. Kirsten was named as the Man of the Match.

References

External links
Cricket Archive

International cricket competitions from 1994–95 to 1997
Kenyan cricket seasons to 1999–2000
Sport in Nairobi
1997 in Kenyan cricket
One Day International cricket competitions
International cricket competitions in Kenya
1996 in Kenyan cricket